Belgrade is a city in Gallatin County, Montana, United States. The population was 10,460 at the 2020 census. It is the largest city in Montana that is not a county seat.

Belgrade and surrounding areas are experiencing significant population growth. The 59714 ZIP Code that includes the city and surrounding commercial and residential developments had an estimated population of 22,560 as of 2020.

The original townsite of Belgrade was established in 1883 when the Northern Pacific Railroad was constructed through the Gallatin Valley. The original town plat was filed in the Gallatin County Clerk and Recorder's Office by Thomas B. Quaw, a businessman from the midwest, in July 1891. According to Quaw, the townsite was an unmanned railroad siding 9.7 miles west of Bozeman, and was named Belgrade after the capital of Serbia, as an expression of appreciation to the Serbian investors who helped finance a portion of the Northern Pacific Railroad. Quaw and William O. Tracy created the Belgrade Grain and Produce Company and marketed Belgrade as the "Princess of the Prairies." Belgrade is part of the Bozeman, MT Micropolitan Statistical Area.

The post office was established in 1887 with Quaw as postmaster. Belgrade was incorporated in 1906.

Bozeman Yellowstone International Airport is located adjacent to the city boundaries.

Geography
Belgrade is located at  (45.7785, -111.1790).

Demographics

2010 census
At the 2010 census there were 7,389 people, 2,965 households, and 1,877 families living in the city. The racial makup of the city was 94.2% White, 0.4% African American, 1.0% Native American, 0.5% Asian, 0.1% Pacific Islander, 1.2% from other races, and 2.5% from two or more races. Hispanic or Latino of any race were 3.8%.

Of the 2,965 households 38.3% had children under the age of 18 living with them, 48.4% were married couples living together, 10.2% had a female householder with no husband present, 4.7% had a male householder with no wife present, and 36.7% were non-families. 26.8% of households were one person and 5% were one person aged 65 or older. The average household size was 2.49 and the average family size was 3.07.

The median age was 30.8 years. 27.5% of residents were under the age of 18; 9.5% were between the ages of 18 and 24; 35.9% were from 25 to 44; 21.5% were from 45 to 64; and 5.7% were 65 or older. The gender makeup of the city was 50.5% male and 49.5% female.

2000 census
At the 2000 census there were 5,728 people, 2,132 households, and 1,507 families living in the city. The population density was 3,429.8 people per square mile (1,324.3/km). There were 2,239 housing units at an average density of 1,340.6 per square mile (517.7/km).  The racial makup of the city was 96.49% White, 0.09% African American, 1.06% Native American, 0.30% Asian, 0.09% Pacific Islander, 0.79% from other races, and 1.19% from two or more races. Hispanic or Latino of any race were 1.94%.

Of the 2,132 households 41.6% had children under the age of 18 living with them, 56.9% were married couples living together, 10.1% had a female householder with no husband present, and 29.3% were non-families. 19.8% of households were one person and 5.1% were one person aged 65 or older. The average household size was 2.68 and the average family size was 3.12.

The age distribution was 29.7% under the age of 18, 11.5% from 18 to 24, 37.3% from 25 to 44, 15.5% from 45 to 64, and 6.1% 65 or older. The median age was 29 years. For every 100 females there were 101.7 males. For every 100 females age 18 and over, there were 99.1 males.

The median household income was $37,392 and the median family income  was $40,378. Males had a median income of $27,154 versus $20,689 for females. The per capita income for the city was $15,266. About 8.1% of families and 11.4% of the population were below the poverty line, including 15.7% of those under age 18 and 7.1% of those age 65 or over.

Government
Belgrade is governed via the mayor council system. The city council consists of six members who are elected from one of three wards. Each ward elects two members. The mayor is elected in a citywide vote.

Education
Belgrade School District educates students from kindergarten through 12th grade. Belgrade High School's team name is the Panthers.

Belgrade  has a public library, the Belgrade Community Library.

Arts and culture
 The Belgrade Special Events Center is a 4,800-seat indoor facility constructed by the Belgrade School District in 1996.  The building is home to the Belgrade High School Panthers basketball, volleyball, and wrestling teams as well as numerous other school and community events. As one of the largest high school athletic facilities in the state, the Special Events Center hosts numerous district, divisional, and state athletic events.  These sporting events bring thousands of people to Belgrade from all over the State of Montana who not only attend the games, but shop in area stores, stay in local motels, and eat in local restaurants.  In March 2010 the facility hosted the State B Girls Basketball Tournament.

The Gallatin Speedway is located on the outskirts of Belgrade northeast of Bozeman Yellowstone International Airport on Tubb Road.  The  dirt oval hosts stock car racing events from May to September.

The Belgrade Fall Festival is an annual tradition (54 years) that takes place on Homecoming Weekend, typically the third weekend in September. The day's activities include a parade, community open-pit beef barbecue, car show, arts and crafts fair at Lewis and Clark Park, and the Belgrade High School Panthers varsity football game.

References

External links

 Official City of Belgrade website
 Belgrade Chamber of Commerce

Cities in Gallatin County, Montana
Serbian-American history
1906 establishments in Montana
Cities in Montana